Alappuzha is a city in Kerala, India. It may also refer to:
 Alappuzha district, a district in Kerala
 Alappuzha (Lok Sabha constituency), a constituency in Kerala